KFF Juban Danja is an Albanian women's football club based in Juban, Guri I Zi in the Shkodër District. The club was founded in 2005 and is the oldest women's football club in Albania. They play their home games at Fusha Sportive Reshit Rusi and they compete in the Women's National Championship.

History 
Ferdinand Jaku created a five-a-side football women's football club in his hometown of Juban, a settlement in Gur i Zi in the Shkodër District. On 6 September 2005 he would go on to form the first recognised women's football club in the country of the same town of Juban. The president of this FC is Jaku, and the vice president is Paulin Zefi.

Honors 
Albanian Women's Cup:
Winners (2): 2011–12, 2012–13
Runners-up (2): 2010–11, 2013–14

Medin Zhega Cup:
Winners (1): 2013

7–8 March Cup:
Winners (1): 2013

Managers 
  Gjon Ndreka (2006–2011)
  Kreshnik Krepi (10 November 2011 – 2013)
  Paulin Zefi (2012)
  Emanuela Jaku (2013–2014)
  Kreshnik Krepi (2014–)

References 

Football clubs in Albania
Association football clubs established in 2005
Guri i Zi, Shkodër
2005 establishments in Albania
Women's football clubs in Albania